Francis Russell, 7th Duke of Bedford,  (13 May 1788 – 14 May 1861), styled Marquess of Tavistock from 1802 to 1839, was a British peer and Whig politician.

Background and education
He was the son of John Russell, 6th Duke of Bedford, and his first wife, the Hon. Georgiana Byng, second daughter of George Byng, 4th Viscount Torrington. Russell was educated at Westminster School and graduated from Trinity College, Cambridge in 1808 as a Master of Arts. He succeeded his father as duke in 1839.

Career
He entered the British House of Commons in 1809, sitting as Member of Parliament for Peterborough in the next three years. Subsequently, Russell represented Bedfordshire until 1832. In the following year, he was summoned to the House of Lords in his father's junior title Baron Howland of Streatham by a writ of acceleration. Russell was sworn of the Privy Council on 6 July 1846 and was invested as a Knight of the Order of the Garter on 26 March 1847. He was made a Special Deputy Warden of the Stannaries in 1852 and was appointed Lord Lieutenant of Bedfordshire in 1859, a post he held until his death in 1861.

Family

Russell was the elder brother of John Russell, 1st Earl Russell, who was twice Prime Minister of Britain.

On 8 August 1808, he married the Lady Anna Stanhope, daughter of Charles Stanhope, 3rd Earl of Harrington, and had by her a son.

Russell died in 1861, aged 73, and was buried on 22 May at the ‘Bedford Chapel’ of St. Michael's Church at Chenies, Buckinghamshire. He was succeeded in his titles by his only son William.

References

External links 
 

1788 births
1861 deaths
Alumni of Trinity College, Cambridge
407
F
Knights of the Garter
Lord-Lieutenants of Bedfordshire
Members of the Privy Council of the United Kingdom
Tavistock, Francis Russell, Marquess of
Russell, Francis
UK MPs 1807–1812
UK MPs 1812–1818
UK MPs 1818–1820
UK MPs 1820–1826
UK MPs 1826–1830
UK MPs 1830–1831
UK MPs 1831–1832
Bedford, D7
Whig (British political party) MPs for English constituencies